Binita Kathayat is a Nepalese media person and politician, belonging to the Rastriya Swatantra Party. She is currently serving as a member of the 2nd Federal Parliament of Nepal. In the 2022 Nepalese general election she was elected as a proportional representative for Khas Arya cluster from rural area. Before being elected to the Federal Parliament of Nepal, she worked at Galaxy 4K Television.

Early life and education 
She belongs to a political family. Her grandfather Narayan Singh Kathayat was a local development officer.

She studied at Seto Bangla School in Kathmandu till ninth grade. She received her tenth grade School Leaving Certificate from a school in Jumla. Under an Indian government scholarship, she studied Political Science in her plus–two level from Dehradun in India. She then received a Diploma in Film Making from Zee Institute of Media Arts in Mumbai.

Career in Media 
After completing her diploma, she returned to Nepal to work in the film industry. She worked an Assistant Director for the movies Loot 2 and Hostel Returns. She also worked as a costume stylist for Chapali Height 2 and Chiso Manchhe.

She also worked as a costume stylist for various television programmes. She produced the television programme Parkhal Bahirako Nepal for Galaxy 4K TV.

Political career 
In 2022 Nepalese general election, her fellow colleague Rabi Lamichhane from Galaxy 4K TV formed a new political party, Rastriya Swatantra Party. RSP invited her to be a representative candidate for Khas Arya cluster from rural area. In the election RSP became the fourth largest party and she was elected to the 2nd Federal Parliament of Nepal.

Filmography

Film

Television

References

People from Jumla District
Living people
Khas people
Nepal MPs 2022–present
Rastriya Swatantra Party politicians
Nepalese directors
Nepalese women journalists
Year of birth missing (living people)